The 1902–03 Cornell men's ice hockey season was the 4th season of play for the program.

Season
Playing games was a struggle for Cornell, with the team only able to play two in this season with both coming over a two-day span.

Note: Cornell University did not formally adopt 'Big Red' as its moniker until after 1905. They have been, however, associated with 'Carnelian and White' since the school's Inauguration Day on October 7, 1868.

Roster

Standings

Schedule and Results

|-
!colspan=12 style=";" | Regular Season

References

Cornell Big Red men's ice hockey seasons
Cornell
Cornell
Cornell
Cornell